Aaron Vega (born August 15, 1970) is an American state legislator who previously represented the 5th Hampden district of the Massachusetts House of Representatives, co-owner of a yoga business, and a former film editor. He has been nominated for the Argentine Film Critics Association's Silver Condor Award for Best Film for directing jazz documentary Van Van - Empezó la fiesta!, and has worked on several PBS documentaries including American Experience and Ken Burns' Jazz. A member of the Democratic Party, Vega began his political career in 2009 when he successfully ran as a city councilor in Holyoke, and subsequently ran successfully for state representative for the 5th Hampden district in 2012. In 2020, then-Mayor Alex Morse appointed Vega as Director of the City of Holyoke's Office of Planning and Economic Development, replacing outgoing director Marcos Marrero; Vega assumed the office on January 21, 2021, and would subsequently lead Mayor Josh Garcia's transition team.

Personal life
The son of local Ecuadorian activist and cofounder of Nueva Esperanza, Carlos Vega, Aaron Vega was born in Holyoke on August 15, 1970 and grew up in South Holyoke, attending Morgan Elementary School, before moving with his mother to New Hampshire. He would graduate from Mascenic Regional High School in 1988, and soon after attended Holyoke Community College and subsequently Keene State College where he received dual bachelor's degrees in psychology and film studies. Over the next several years he would do work on a number of PBS documentaries as an editor, including several directed by Ken Burns, working out of New York City before returning to Holyoke in 2002. In 2008, Vega opened a yoga studio with his wife in the converted Lyman Mills, now known as Open Square, becoming a mobile yoga service in 2017. Today Vega resides in Holyoke with his wife Debra, who teaches dance at Mount Holyoke College, his three daughters, and son. He is a member of the board of the Carlos Vega Fund for Social Justice.

Selected filmography
Vega has worked as an editor for a number of films, primarily human interest stories told through documentaries. He is credited as the film editor of the following works, unless otherwise noted
 Refugee Kids: One Small School Takes on the World, 2014, short
 Héroes, 2011, TV movie (Puerto Rico), director
 Sosúa: Make a Better World, 2009, documentary
 American Experience
 A Class Apart, 2009
 Race to the Moon, 2005
 Artists of the Bahamas, 2008, documentary edited with Scott Hancock
 Through Deaf Eyes, 2007, documentary
 Clock Paint Eyeball, 2006, short, edited with Chris Ohlson
 My Electric Bill, 2006, short
 Addison's Wall, 2005, drama
 Front Wards, Back Wards, 2005, documentary
 The Spin Cycle, 2004, short
 Blue Vinyl, 2002, post-production coordinator
 The New Sideshow, 2002, TV movie
 Ram Dass, Fierce Grace, 2001, documentary
 Jazz (TV series), 2001, 3 episodes
 The True Welcome: 1929-1934
 The Gift: 1917-1924
 Gumbo: Beginnings to 1917
 Van Van - Empezó la fiesta!, 2001, director with Liliana Mazure, documentary, nominated for 2002 Silver Condor Award for Best Film
 Lewis & Clark: The Journey of the Corps of Discovery, 1997, assistant editor

Massachusetts House of Representatives (2013–2021)
Vega ran for the Massachusetts House of Representative's 5th Hampden District legislative seat, which was made vacant upon the resignation of incumbent State Representative Michael F. Kane who accepted a position with Columbia Gas of Massachusetts. He defeated the Republican nominee Ward 5 City Councilor Linda M. Vacon and Green-Rainbow nominee Jerome T. Hobert and was sworn-in on January 2, 2013. He is a member of the Massachusetts Black and Latino Legislative Caucus.

Committee assignments
 Committee on Personnel and Administration
 Joint Committee on Economic Development and Emerging Technologies
 Joint Committee on Higher Education

Electoral history
Massachusetts House of Representatives, 5th Hampden District, 2018:
 Aaron Vega (D) – 10,199	 (99.6%)
 All Others – 38 (0.4%)
 Blank Votes – 2,214

Massachusetts House of Representatives, 5th Hampden District, 2016:
 Aaron Vega (D) – 13,687 (99.7%)
 All Others – 40 (0.3%)
 Blank Votes – 3,312

Massachusetts House of Representatives, 5th Hampden District, 2012:
 Aaron Vega (D) – 9,545 (60.8%)
 Linda Vacon (R) – 3,211 (20.5%)
 Jermone Hobert (Green-Rainbow) – 2,939 (18.7%)

Democratic primary for the Massachusetts House of Representatives, 5th Hampden District, 2012:
 Aaron Vega – 1,947 (65.4%)
 Michael F. Kane (inc.) – 999 (33.6%)

Holyoke City Council, At-large, 2011:
 Kevin Jourdain (inc.) – 5,029
 Peter Tallman – 4,834
 Aaron Vega (inc.) – 4,697
 Joseph McGiverin (inc.) – 4,675
 Brenna Murphy (inc.) – 4,528
 Daniel Bresnahan – 4,264
 James Leahy (inc.) – 4,252
 Rebecca Lisi – 4,213
 Patricia Devine (inc.) – 3,886
 John Whelihan – 3,675
 Yasser Menwer – 1,706

See also
 2019–2020 Massachusetts legislature

References

External links
 Vega for Holyoke City Councilor-at-Large, 2011 municipal campaign website from the Internet Archive
 VegaClips, former film editing portfolio site

American people of Ecuadorian descent
American politicians of Ecuadorian descent
Living people
Democratic Party members of the Massachusetts House of Representatives
1970 births
21st-century American politicians
Politicians from Holyoke, Massachusetts
Holyoke Community College alumni
Hispanic and Latino American state legislators in Massachusetts